Charoen Rat Road is a road in Bangkok's Thonburi side. Charoen Rat  is a road in form of soi (alleyway) overlaps between Khlong San and Khlong Ton Sai Sub-district, Khlong San District. It is not far from Wongwian Yai BTS station.

Charoen Rat is a road that connects Somdet Phra Chao Tak Sin Road in the area of Wongwian Yai Market, opposite Wongwian Yai railway station with Charoen Nakhon Road in the beginning phase, opposite Khlong San pier and former Khlongsan Plaza beside ICONSIAM.

Although it is a short road, but it is important in terms of being a center of leather goods shops in Bangkok. There are specialty shops with supplies for shoe-making, belt-making with purse-making etc. The shops have awls, wooden yardsticks, wax, die-cut tools, mallets, silver pens for writing on leather, vinyl, canvas, zippers by the roll, purse handles, chains, snaps, buckles and of course leather. It is considered as the largest and popular center of leather production equipment in Bangkok.

Affiliated bus line: 57 is the only bus that runs all the length of the road.

Moreover, at night, it is also considered a very popular and renowned street food center. Some restaurant here received 2019 Bib Gourmand from Michelin Guide as well.

Originally, throughout the length of the road, used to be the Maeklong railway line, which ran south as far as terminating in Samut Songkhram Province. The terminal station, Pak Khlong San used to be located on the inactive Khlongsan Plaza market (due to the expiration of the land lease agreement with the SRT in 2020). The station was dismantled and railway was filled in to make way for the road and bus stops in 1961 according to the cabinet resolution of the Field Marshal Sarit Thanarat government, to ease traffic congestion in Bangkok. Therefore, causing the origin of Maeklong railway line became Wongwian Yai railway station in the Wongwian Yai quarter instead.

References

Streets in Bangkok
Khlong San district